Toronto is a city in eastern Jefferson County, Ohio, located along the Ohio River 6 miles northeast of Steubenville. The population was 5,303 at the time of the 2020 census, making it the second-largest city in Jefferson County. It is part of the Weirton–Steubenville metropolitan area.

History

The area was first settled in the 19th century, when it was known as Newburg's Landing. When the railway was built, however, the area's name was changed to Sloanes Station. In 1881, after a vote, the town was incorporated under its present name inspired by the Canadian city of the same name, which civic leader Thomas M. Daniels felt was a place worth emulating. Along with its Canadian counterpart, it is one of only two incorporated cities in the world named Toronto.

In the 20th century, the town became a center of heavy industry with a number of large factories in and around the town. In the 1980s and 1990s the city, along with the rest of the region, declined sharply as manufacturing jobs left. Titanium Metals Corporation, the world's largest supplier of titanium metals, is the major employer in the city.

Geography
Toronto is located at  (40.462266, -80.604443), and is about 45 minutes from Pittsburgh.

Demographics

2010 census
As of the census of 2010, there were 5,091 people, 2,278 households, and 1,395 families living in the city. The racial makeup of the city was 97.1% White, 1.1% African American, 0.2% Native American, 0.2% Asian, 0.1% from other races, and 1.3% from two or more races. Hispanic or Latino of any race were 0.8% of the population.

There were 2,278 households, of which 26.2% had children under the age of 18 living with them, 42.5% were married couples living together, 14.0% had a female householder with no husband present, 4.7% had a male householder with no wife present, and 38.8% were non-families. 34.0% of all households were made up of individuals, and 15.8% had someone living alone who was 65 years of age or older. The average household size was 2.23 and the average family size was 2.84.

The median age in the city was 44 years. 20.7% of residents were under the age of 18; 7.5% were between the ages of 18 and 24; 23.1% were from 25 to 44; 30.5% were from 45 to 64; and 18.1% were 65 years of age or older. The gender makeup of the city was 46.9% male and 53.1% female.

2000 census
As of the census of 2000, there were 5,676 people, 2,452 households, and 1,593 families living in the city. The population density was 3,014.6 people per square mile (1,165.7/km). There were 2,627 housing units at an average density of 1,395.2 per square mile (539.5/km). The racial makeup of the city was 97.60% White, 1.00% African American, 0.19% Native American, 0.21% Asian, 0.07% from other races, and 0.92% from two or more races. Hispanic or Latino of any race were 0.48% of the population.

There were 2,452 households, out of which 28.5% had children under the age of 18 living with them, 49.3% were married couples living together, 12.5% had a female householder with no husband present, and 35.0% were non-families. 31.3% of all households were made up of individuals, and 15.7% had someone living alone who was 65 years of age or older. The average household size was 2.31 and the average family size was 2.90.

In the city the age distribution of the population shows 22.8% under the age of 18, 8.0% from 18 to 24, 26.4% from 25 to 44, 24.9% from 45 to 64, and 17.9% who were 65 years of age or older. The median age was 41 years. For every 100 females, there were 85.0 males. For every 100 females age 18 and over, there were 80.9 males.

The median income for a household in the city was $30,905, and the median income for a family was $38,585. Males had a median income of $37,042 versus $19,405 for females. The per capita income for the city was $15,761. About 11.1% of families and 13.4% of the population were below the poverty line, including 22.2% of those under age 18 and 7.4% of those age 65 or over.

Education
Public education in the city is provided by the Toronto City School District. The current schools serving the Toronto include:
Karaffa Elementary School – grades PK-5
Toronto High School – grades 6–12

Toronto has a public library, a branch of the Public Library of Steubenville and Jefferson County.

Notable people
John Comer, football player for the Canton Bulldogs
Clarke Hinkle, football player for the Green Bay Packers; Pro Football Hall of Fame inductee
Gary A. Myers, member of the U.S. House of Representatives for Pennsylvania's 25th congressional district
Bill Peterson, head football coach for Florida State Seminoles, Rice Owls, and the Houston Oilers
Robert Urich, Actor most known for television shows Vega$ and Spenser: For Hire
Bob Vogel, football player for the Baltimore Colts
Charles M. Stratton, National Nintendo Duck Hunt Champion, 1996 and 1998

See also
 List of cities and towns along the Ohio River

References

External links
 City website
 Toronto Chamber of Commerce
 Toronto Coalition for Revitalization "Building Our Future on the Strength of Our Past"
 Toronto In Focus City-based communications through the internet.

 
Cities in Ohio
Cities in Jefferson County, Ohio
Ohio populated places on the Ohio River
Canadian-American culture in Ohio
Populated places established in 1881
1881 establishments in Ohio